The 2014 Nordic Under-17 Football Championship is the 37th edition of the Nordic Under-17 Football Championship, an annual football competition between men's under-17 national teams organised by the football federations of the Nordic countries. The 2014 tournament was hosted by Denmark, from 28 July to 2 August 2014.

Teams

Participating teams came from the Nordic nations of Denmark, Faroe Islands, Finland, Iceland, Norway and Sweden, as well as the 10 times winners England and the United States. Each nation sent an 18-man squad composed of players born on or after 1 January 1998.

Venues

Nørre Aaby Stadion, Nørre Aaby
Kolding Stadion, Kolding
Mosevej Stadion, Kolding

Group stage
All times are in CEST (UTC+02)
.

If a group stage game ends in a draw a penalty shoot out is held to determine final position in the group if the two teams then finish level on points and goal difference

Group A

Group B

Play-off stage

7th place play-off

5th place play-off

3rd place play-off

Final

References

External links
Official Danish FA tournament site
Swedish FA tournament site

2014 in American soccer
2014 in Faroe Islands football
2014 in Finnish football
2014 in Icelandic football
2014 in Norwegian football
2014 in Swedish football
2014 in youth association football
2014–15 in Danish football
2014–15 in English football
2014
2014